Chiara "Chichi" Scholl (born July 5, 1992) is an American tennis player.

Scholl has won 11 singles and 23 doubles titles on the ITF Women's Circuit. On 17 October 2011, she reached her best singles ranking of world No. 164. On 13 August 2018, she peaked at No. 187 in the WTA doubles rankings.

Grand Slam singles performance timeline

ITF Circuit finals

Singles: 20 (11 titles, 9 runner–ups)

Doubles: 43 (23 titles, 20 runner–ups)

References

External links
 
 

1992 births
Living people
American female tennis players
21st-century American women